The Seven Wonders of Ukraine are the seven historical and cultural monuments of Ukraine, which were chosen in the Seven Wonders of Ukraine contest held in July, 2007. This was the first public contest of that kind which was followed by the Seven Natural Wonders of Ukraine, the Seven Wonderful Routes of Ukraine, and the Seven Wonderful Castles of Ukraine. All nominated  sites are publicly owned protected areas of at least regional level, available for tourism.

The voting for all contests consisted of two parts: experts in Ukraine voted for their seven best sites, and internet users voted for their seven favorite sites on the official website.

History
The initiative was started by (one of the) deputy chairman of Verkhovna Rada Mykola Tomenko under the motto "Piznai Ukrainu!" (Discover Ukraine). The initiative was a continuation of numerous preceding public actions that took place in various regions of Ukraine such as "Kupala's games at the native land of Gogol" (Poltava region), "Starry autumn in Kachanivka" (Chernihiv region), "Let's discover island Khortytsia" (Zaporizhzhia Oblast), "Maslyana in Bukovina" (Chernivtsi region), "Amber legends of Rivne region", "Day of Europe at the native land of Lesya Ukrainka" (Volyn region), and others.

The next stage of the initiative was the organization of the Seven Natural Wonders of Ukraine in 2008.

Organization committee

The organization committee consisted of:
 Mykola Tomenko (parliamentarian of the 5th convocation of the Ukrainian parliament)
 Andriy Pakhlya (head of State Service of tourism and vacation resorts)
 Oleksandr Volkov (parliamentarian of the 5th convocation of the Ukrainian parliament)
 Oleksandr Bryhynets (Kyiv city politician)
 Yuri Artymenko (deputy head of parliamentary committee)
 Volodymyr Kurinny (head of Vekhovna Rada subcommittee)
 Volodymyr Ilchenko (chief-editor of "Mandry" magazine)
 Oleksandr Bohutsky (general director of Ukrainian TV-channel ICTV)
 Viktor Kolesnyk (dean of historic department of Kyiv University)
 Viktor Nabrusko (president of the National Radio company of Ukraine)
 Ihor Pasichnyk (rector of the National university Ostroh Academy)
 Nataliya Sumska (National actress of Ukraine)
 Anzhelika Rudnytska (Distinguished actress of Ukraine)
 Volodymyr Shevchenko (rector of Donetsk National University)
 Oleksandr Kharchenko (chief-editor of informational agency UNIAN)

Partners
 Tut i tam – site of the tourism gourmands
 For Kyiv – Internet-portal
 Mandry – magazine
 National Radio company of Ukraine
 UNIAN – information agency
 ICTV – television channel

Selection
Local and provincial (oblast) authorities composed a list of 1,000 possible candidates. An expert council consisting of 100 people, including culturologists, historians, and tourist specialists, chose a list of 21 candidates from which people on the internet could vote.

Voting on the 21 possible candidates was opened on July 7, 2007. A total of around 77,000 internet users voted in the campaign. The voting was closed on August 21, 2007 and the results were officially announced on the same day. The campaign was initiated in May 2007 by Mykola Tomenko, a Ukrainian politician and the deputy of the Parliament of Ukraine of the fifth convocation.

Each manager of a winning nomination was awarded a statue of their candidate made out of green marble, matte steel, and gold-mirror acrylic paint.

Results
Just before the next Independence Day of Ukraine, on 21 August 2007 were announced final results of the voting.

List

Special nominations
Three objects from the nomination list awarded a special recognition:

the Livadia Palace, a monument of modern history, Livadiysky Palace-Museum, Monument of Architecture;
the Ostroh Castle, a spiritual monument, part of the Ostroh Regional Museum;
the Pysanka Museum in Kolomyia, a monument of modern Ukraine, part of National Museum of Hutsul-land and Pokuttia folk-art of Yosafat Kobrynsky.

Full ranking lists
 Ranking by votes of internet-users: 1) Khortytsia, 2) Sofiyivka, 3) Kamianets, 4) Kyiv Monastery of the Caves, 5) Khotyn Fortress, 6) Chersoneses Taurica, 7) Livadia Palace, 8) Pysanka Museum, 9) Sophia of Kyiv, 10) Ostroh Castle and the Academy, 11) Odesa Opera Theater, 12) Stone Grave, 13) Palanok Castle, 14) Pochayiv Monastery, 15) Lutsk Castle, 16) Saint Anthony's Caves, 17) House of the State Industry, 18) Olesko Castle, 19) Holy Mountains Monastery, 20) Pereyaslav, 21) Shevchenko Heritage Park
 Ranking by votes of experts: 1) Kyiv Monastery of the Caves, 2) Sophia of Kyiv, 3) Sofiyivka, 4) Chersoneses Taurica, 5) Kamianets, 6) Holy Mountains Monastery, 7) Khortytsia, 8) Pochayiv Monastery, 9) Stone Grave, 10) Livadia Palace, 11) Saint Anthony's Caves, 12) Khotyn Fortress, 13) Ostroh Castle and the Academy, 14) Odesa Opera Theater, 15) Olesko Castle, 16) Shevchenko Heritage Park, 17) Pysanka Museum, 18) Palanok Castle, 19) Pereyaslav, 20) Lutsk Castle, 21) House of the State Industry

All contenders

 Kyiv: Kyiv Monastery of the Caves, Sophia of Kyiv, House with Chimeras;
 Crimea: Levadia Palace, Mithridat Mount, Alupka Palace and Park Heritage Center, Swallow's Nest;
 Vinnytsia Oblast: Nikolay Pirogov Manor, Old Slavic Cave Temple with Bush Relief, Nemyriv Schythian oppidum;
 Volyn Oblast: Liubats Castle, Volodymyr complex of historic and cultural landmarks, Lesya Ukrainka Museum in Kolodiazhne, Chelm Icon of Virgin Mary;
 Dnipropetrovsk Oblast: Stone Female Sculptures, Ivan Sirko Grave, Novomoskovsk Trinity Cathedral, Nativity of Mary Church, Ukrainian line;
 Donetsk Oblast: Historic and Architectural Preserve in Sviatohirsk;
 Zhytomyr Oblast: Saint Basil the Great Church, Stoney village, Korolyov Museum of Astronautics;
 Zakarpattia Oblast: Palanok Castle, Forest and rafting museum at Chorna River, Saint Michael Orthodox Church, Nevytske Castle;
 Zaporizhzhia Oblast: Historic and Archaeological Preserve "Stone Grave", Khortytsia, DnieperHES;
 Ivano-Frankivsk Oblast: Pysanka Museum, Dovbush Rocks, Holy Spirit Church;
 Kyiv Oblast: Pereyaslav Historic and Ethnographic Preserve, Lyutizh Beachhead, Ivan Kozlovsky Manor, Arboretum Oleksandriya, Dobranychivka Archaeological Site, Holy Protection Church, Kateryna Bilokur Manor;
 Kirovohrad Oblast: Tobilevych Museum Heritage Park, Saint Elisabeth Fortress, Kirovohrad Oblast Art Museum;
 Luhansk Oblast: Vladimir Dal Literature Museum, Memorial "To the Fighters of the Revolution", Derkul Horse Farm complex;
 Lviv Oblast: Olesko Castle, Svirzh Castle, Pidhirtsi Castle, Krekhiv Monastery, Tustan Fortress;
 Mykolaiv Oblast: Historic and Archaeological Preserve Olbia, Wild Garden Archaeological Landmark;
 Odesa Oblast: Odesa Theater of Opera and Ballet, Akkerman Fortress, Potemkin Stairs;
 Poltava Oblast: Gogol Museum Preserve, Kotlyarevsky Literature and Memorial Museum and Manor, Saint Nicholas Church, Poltava Regional Studies Museum, Poltava Exaltation of the Holy Cross Monastery;
 Rivne Oblast: Ostroh Castle and the Academy, Saint Trinity Monastery, Dubno Castle;
 Sumy Oblast: Monument to the Mammoth, Round Courtyard, Reverend Sophroni Monastery;
 Ternopil Oblast: Verteba Cave, Bohyt Mount, Buchach Townhall (Rathaus), Pochaiv Monastery, Zavarnytsia Spiritual Center, Vyshnivets Palace Complex, UPA Camp, Castles of the Ternopil Region Historic and Architectural Preserve;
 Kharkiv Oblast: House of the State Industry, Holy Protection Monastery, Skovoroda Literary and Memorial Museum;
 Kherson Oblast: Askania-Nova Park, Legendary Armed Charabanc, Goat Grave, Shovkunenko Art Museum in Kherson, Saint Catherinian Cathedral;
 Khmelnytskyi Oblast: Kamianets Historic and Architectural Preserve, Medzhybizh Historic and Cultural Preserve, Samchyky Historic and Cultural Preserve;
 Cherkasy Oblast: Arboretum Sofiyivka, Taras Shevchenko Homeland Heritage Park, Trypillia Culture Historic and Cultural Preserve, Shevchenko Heritage Park;
 Chernivtsi Oblast: Khotyn Fortress Historic and Architectural Preserve, Bukovina Metropolitan Bishops Residence, Russian Old Believers Assumption Cathedral;
 Chernihiv Oblast: Saint Anthony's Caves, Saint Transfiguration Cathedral, Hustynia Monastery, Princely Burg (Gord);
 Sevastopol: 1854–1855 Sevastopol Defense Panorama, Chersoneses Taurica.

Seven Natural Wonders

The Seven Natural Wonders of Ukraine (Sim pryrodnikh Tchudes Ukrainy) is the selection of the most popular and unique natural landmarks in Ukraine, as the second stage of the Seven Wonders of Ukraine national program. All seven sites are publicly owned protected areas of at least regional level, available for tourism.

Special Nominations
Three objects from the nomination list needed a special nomination: 
 Balaklava Bay, Balaklava (Sevastopol)
 Oleshky Sands, the biggest desert in Europe near Askania-Nova
 Optimistic Caves, the biggest cave on the continent, near village of Korolivka, Ternopil Oblast

Other important nominees
 Basalt columns
 Bukovina waterfalls
 Hoverla
 Desna floodplains
 Danube Biosphere Preserve
 Stone Tombs
 Kaniv Mount
Karadag Nature Preserve
 Kochubei Oaks
 Tustan
 Apple Colony

Selection program
which were chosen in the Seven Natural Wonders of Ukraine on August 26, 2008. The voting consisted of two parts: experts in Ukraine voted for their seven best sites, and internet users voted for their seven favorite sites on the official website.

As for the original event of the Seven Wonders of Ukraine the local and provincial (oblast) authorities composed a list of 1,000 possible candidates. An expert council consisting of 100 people, including culturologists, historians, and tourist specialists, chose a list of 21 candidates from which people on the internet could vote.

The internet voting on the 21 possible candidates was opened on July 7, 2008, at the program's web-site. A total of around 77,000 internet users voted in the campaign. The voting was closed on August 26, 2008, and the results were officially announced on the same day. The whole campaign was initiated back in May 2007 by Mykola Tomenko a Ukrainian politician and the deputy of the Parliament of Ukraine of the fifth convocation.

Each manager of a winning nomination was awarded a statue of their candidate made out of green marble, matte steel, and gold-mirror acrylic paint.

Castles and Palaces
The Seven Wondrous Castles and Palaces of Ukraine (Sim chudesnykh zamkiv ta palatsiv Ukrayiny) is the third stage of the Seven Wonders of Ukraine program that has resumed after a three-year break. They are another seven wondrous attractions of Ukraine, which were chosen in the Seven Wonders of Ukraine (castles, fortresses, palaces) on December 1, 2011. During the break there were intentions to conduct a competition for the Seven Wondrous Marchroutes of Ukraine, but that idea was scratched and was never realized. The voting for seven wondrous palaces and castles, as its preceding events, consisted of two parts: experts in Ukraine voted for their seven best sites, and internet users voted for their seven favorite sites on the official website.

As for the original event of the Seven Wonders of Ukraine, the local and provincial (oblast) authorities composed a list of 138 possible candidates. An expert council consisting of 100 people, including culturologists, historians, and tourist specialists, chose a list of 21 candidates (7 fortresses, 7 palaces, 7 castles) from which people on the internet could vote.

The internet voting on the 21 possible candidates was opened on August 22, 2011 at the program's web-site. A total of around 77,000 internet users voted in the campaign. The voting was closed on December 1, 2011, and the results were officially announced on the same day. The whole campaign was initiated back in May 2007 by Mykola Tomenko, a Ukrainian politician and the deputy of the Parliament of Ukraine of the fifth convocation.

Each manager of a winning nomination was awarded a statue of their candidate made out of green marble, matte steel, and gold-mirror acrylic paint.

Special Nominations
Three objects from the nomination list needed a special nomination: 
 Olesko Castle, Olesko, Lviv Oblast
 Chyhyryn Fortress, Chyhyryn, Cherkasy Oblast
 Bakhchisaray Palace, Bakhchisaray, Crimea
 Kyrylo Rozumovsky Palace, Baturyn, Chernihiv Oblast

Other important nominees
 Dubno Castle
 Medzhybizh Fortress
 Genoese Fortress
 Palanok Castle
 Zolochiv Castle
 Uzhhorod Castle
 Mariinskyi Palace
 Kyiv Fortress
 Livadia Palace
 Zbarazh Castle

See also
 Seven Wonders of the World
 List of UNESCO World Heritage Sites in Ukraine
 Wonders of the World
 Protected areas of Ukraine
 Marble Caves, Crimea

References

External links
 
 
 
 
 

Tourist attractions in Ukraine
Ukrainian culture
Tourism in Ukraine
U
Lists of monuments and memorials in Ukraine